Softball, for the 2013 Bolivarian Games, took place from 23 November to 30 November 2013. Women's under 23 team competed at these Games. The Dominican Republic won the gold medal ahead of silver medalists Venezuela and Colombia, Bronze.

Medalists

References

Events at the 2013 Bolivarian Games
2013 in softball
2013 Bolivarian Games